The 1922 Lehigh Brown and White football team was an American football team that represented Lehigh University as an independent during the 1922 college football season. In its first season under head coach James A. Baldwin, the team compiled a 3–5–1 record and outscored opponents by a total of 84 to 80. The team played its home games at Taylor Stadium in Bethlehem, Pennsylvania.

Schedule

References

Lehigh
Lehigh Mountain Hawks football seasons
Lehigh football